John Stephens Durham (1861–1919) was an early African-American journalist, author, attorney, civil engineer, and diplomat who served as United States Minister Resident to Haiti.

Family
John S. Durham was born on July 18, 1861 in Philadelphia, Pennsylvania, to Elizabeth Stephens and John Durham, whose brothers helped establish the African Methodist Episcopal Church. Durham's grandfather purportedly took part in Nat Turner's slave rebellion. In 1897 Durham married Constance Mackenzie, a white woman who was superintendent of the Philadelphia kindergarten schools, and they had two sons.

Education
Due to his father's early death, Durham worked when he was young while attending the Philadelphia public schools. He graduated from the Institute for Colored Youths on Bainbridge street, and then served as a teacher and principal at various schools in Pennsylvania, Delaware, and New Jersey. Durham then attended and graduated from the University of Pennsylvania in 1886 with a bachelor of science degree. While a student he played football and edited The Daily Pennsylvanian and also wrote for The Times. After graduation Durham attended and graduated from a University of Pennsylvania graduate program in civil engineering in 1888 and also attended the University of Pennsylvania Law School in 1887-88 but did not graduate. He worked for the Philadelphia Bulletin for several years after graduation.

Career
In 1891 Republican President Benjamin Harrison appointed Durham to replace Frederick Douglass as United States Minister Resident to Haiti and U.S. Charge d'Affaires to Santo Domingo. He served from July 30, 1891 to November 7, 1893. After the ambassadorship, Durham studied and passed the bar exam in 1895, and then returned in 1896 to Santo Domingo to manage a sugar plantation for four years. In 1902 President Theodore Roosevelt appointed Durham as assistant U.S. Attorney with the Spanish Treaty Claims Commission in Cuba where he served until 1910. He also maintained a large private law practice in Cuba and owned sugar plantations, leaving a large estate upon his death. Durham authored Diane, Priestess of Haiti and To Teach the Negro History: a suggestion.

John Stephens Durham died in London on October 17, 1919.

References

Ambassadors of the United States to Haiti
Ambassadors of the United States to the Dominican Republic
University of Pennsylvania alumni
University of Pennsylvania School of Arts and Sciences alumni
University of Pennsylvania School of Engineering and Applied Science alumni
University of Pennsylvania Law School alumni 
The Daily Pennsylvanian people
American engineers
African-American diplomats
African-American lawyers
African-American novelists
Writers from Philadelphia
Lawyers from Philadelphia
19th-century American diplomats